HKP may refer to:

 Hanko Northern railway station, in Finland
 Himachal Kranti Party, a political party in Himachal Pradesh, India
 Hong Kong Phooey, an American animated television series
 Hong Kong Police Force
 Kaanapali Airport, in Hawaii, United States
 OpenPGP HTTP Keyserver Protocol
 People's Liberation Party, a Marxist–Leninist group in Turkey
 Croatian Catholic movement